Daniel Loss is a Swiss theoretical physicist and a professor of Theoretical Condensed Matter Physics at the University of Basel and RIKEN. With David P. DiVincenzo (at IBM Research), he proposed the Loss-DiVincenzo quantum computer in 1997, which would use electron spins in quantum dots as qubits.

Loss was born in 1958 in Winterthur, Switzerland. He studied Medicine at the University of Zurich for two years before transferring to physics. 1985 he obtained his PhD in physics in Zurich with a thesis on statistical mechanics under the supervision of A. Thellung. After postdoctoral stays in Zurich and at the University of Illinois in Urbana, where he worked with Anthony Leggett, he worked as a research scientist at the IBM T. J. Watson Research Center in Yorktown Heights. In 1993 he became professor at the Simon Fraser University in Vancouver, Canada and since 1996 he is full professor at the University of Basel.

Loss' research concerns the quantum theory of condensed-matter- and solid-state physics. In particular, he studies spin- and charge-effects in semiconducting and magnetic nanostructures. He is one of the leading theorists investigating the realization of quantum information processing protocols in semiconductor structures. His 1998 paper (jointly with David DiVincenzo) proposing the use of spin qubits in semiconductor quantum dots is the foundation of one of the main approaches towards the realization of a quantum computer and (as of 2018) has been cited more than 6000 times. Further lines of research include decoherence, nuclear spin physics, topological matter, Majorana fermions and parafermions.

Selected honors and awards 

 2000: Fellow of the American Physical Society
 2005: Fellow of the Institute of Physics, UK
 2005: Humboldt Research Prize
 2010: Marcel Benoist Prize
 2014: Member of the German National Academy of Sciences Leopoldina
 2017: King Faisal International Prize in Science (Physics)

References

External links

  (includes CV and publication list)

Living people
Swiss physicists
1958 births
Fellows of the American Physical Society
Fellows of the Institute of Physics
Quantum physicists
Quantum information scientists
Members of the German Academy of Sciences Leopoldina